Apistosia humeralis is a moth of the subfamily Arctiinae. It was described by Augustus Radcliffe Grote in 1867. It is found on Cuba.

References

Moths described in 1867
Lithosiini
Moths of the Caribbean
Endemic fauna of Cuba